Botswana is divided into 10 administrative districts, two cities, five towns and 11 sub districts. These are administered by 16 local authorities (district councils, city councils or town councils).

See also
Sub-districts of Botswana
List of districts of Botswana by Human Development Index
ISO 3166-2:BW
https://www.knowbotswana.com/botswana-cities-and-districts.html
Statistics Botswana Website

References

 
Subdivisions of Botswana
Botswana, Districts
Botswana 1
Districts, Botswana
Botswana geography-related lists